The InterContinental Vienna is a hotel in Vienna, centrally located adjacent to the Stadtpark. It has a total of 458 guest rooms and suites and conference facilities with 1,200 m2.

Location 
The hotel is a detached building located between the Vienna Stadtpark and the Vienna Konzerthaus. The Stadtpark underground station is located next to the hotel on Johannesgasse.

History 

InterContinental Vienna, which opened on March 4, 1964, was the first hotel belonging to an international chain to open in Vienna. With more than 500 rooms, the “Vienna Intercontinental”, as it was originally named, was not only one of the world's largest hotels, but also one of the most modern. InterContinental Vienna brought a completely new type of hotel with novel features to the Austrian capital. Upon completion, there were 504 rooms on 12 levels (until its destruction in 1945, Hotel Metropol, with 360 rooms, was by far Vienna's largest hotel).

When the InterContinental Vienna opened, it was the twenty-third hotel to become part of the InterContinental Hotels Group, a hotel chain founded by the airline Pan American World Airways.

Architecture and Construction Method 
Holabird and Root, an architecture firm that had played a major role in the development of the steel-frame skyscrapers in the United States, was commissioned to design the hotel, and in particular, to create a corporate identity for it. The Viennese architect Carl Appel was selected as contact architect.

Client and Architect 
At the time he was commissioned to prepare and supervise the construction of the InterContinental Hotel, Carl Appel was a well established architect. His office produced a number of buildings for the private and public sectors; these included office buildings, administrative buildings and apartment houses. Immediately following the Second World War, on account of their sound education and experience, Appel and colleagues such as Erich Boltenstern, Max Fellerer and Oswald Haerdtl played a role in the reconstruction of the city – a task that demanded economical construction methods. In his work, Appel distinguished himself above all through his profound talent in tectonics and his willingness to employ new construction methods. The facade of the hotel's reinforced-concrete structure, for example, is clad in Tyrolean sandstone and small-format, colourful mosaic stone; the casting process employed was an innovation that made the cladding particularly robust.

Space at a Premium 
The InterContinental Vienna is 39 metres high, making it one of the city's first skyscrapers. The original design of the hotel envisioned a height of 50 metres, which was however ruled out due to urban planning constraints: firstly, the famed view from the Belvedere Palace to Vienna's historic centre would have been damaged, and secondly, a building of this height would have increased wind and endangering trees in the neighbouring Stadtpark. In cooperation with the city's building authority, Appel took the context into account and reduced the building height. In order to accommodate the demanding area requirements (504 hotel rooms, rooms for social events, extensive Building Services installations plus 240 parking spaces), he proposed a T-shaped floor plan and reduced the typical storey height to 2.45 metres. The city building authority approved the latter change on the grounds that the hotel was to be fully air-conditioned. The lower ceiling height was not merely an attempt to increase the hotel's floor area, but can also be considered part of a tradition dating back to the early twentieth century, when Adolf Loos developed his Raumplan: the height of a space was determined based on its use.

Today 

Over the years, the interiors of the InterContinental Vienna have been renovated. The present design of the lobby and conference facilities is the work of the interior architect Pierre Yves Rochon. Recent renovations include those carried out from October 2008 to June 2009: the British design firm Y2k created a new look for all twelve guest levels, the Club Lounge and the presidential suite.

Literature 
 Friedrich Achleitner: Eine Masse ohne Maß. Neues Bauen kritisch betrachtet: The Vienna InterContinental Hotel. In: Die Presse, 21./22. March 1964, p. 9
 Gudrun Hausegger: Hotel InterContinental Wien - Internationaler Funktionalismus im Herzen von Wien, May 2011
Sources for the topic 'architecture':
 Werner Blaser: Chicago Architecture. Holabird & Root. 1880–1992. Birkhäuser Verlag, Basel/Boston/Berlin 1992
 Carl Appel: Carl Appel: Architekt zwischen Gestern und Morgen. Böhlau Verlag, Wien 1988.

References

External links 

 http://www.vienna.intercontinental.com/
 InterContinental Vienna history in cosmopolis.ch

Hotels in Vienna
1964 establishments in Austria
Hotels established in 1964
InterContinental hotels
Hotel buildings completed in 1964
20th-century architecture in Austria